Gustav Hareide (born 24 January 1950) is a Norwegian politician for the Progress Party.

He served as a deputy representative to the Parliament of Norway from Møre og Romsdal during the terms 1989–1993 and 1997–2001. In total he met during 4 days of parliamentary session.

References

1950 births
Living people
Deputy members of the Storting
Progress Party (Norway) politicians
Møre og Romsdal politicians
Place of birth missing (living people)
20th-century Norwegian politicians
21st-century Norwegian politicians